Strathspey Railway may refer to two railways in Scotland:

Strathspey Railway (preserved), a preserved railway running from Aviemore to Broomhill
Strathspey Railway (GNoSR), between Boat of Garten and Dufftown, closed in 1966